Montornès de Segarra is a municipality in the comarca of the Segarra in the Province of Lleida, in Catalonia, Spain. It is situated in the west of the comarca and is served by the L-210 road. Montornès de Segarra became part of the Segarra in the comarcal revision of 1990: previously it formed part of the Urgell. The municipality contains two urban centres, Montornès de Segarra and Mas de Bondia.

Population

References

 Panareda Clopés, Josep Maria; Rios Calvet, Jaume; Rabella Vives, Josep Maria (1989). Guia de Catalunya, Barcelona: Caixa de Catalunya.  (Spanish).  (Catalan).

External links
Official website 
 Government data pages 

Municipalities in Segarra
Populated places in Segarra